Whitewater Township is one of thirteen townships in Franklin County, Indiana. As of the 2010 census, its population was 2,684.

History
Whitewater Township was created in 1816.

The Snow Hill Covered Bridge and Salmon Turrell Farmstead are listed on the National Register of Historic Places.

Geography

Unincorporated towns
 Ashby (extinct)
 Drewersburg
 New Trenton
 Rockdale
 Sharptown
(This list is based on USGS data and may include former settlements.)

Major highways
 U.S. Route 52
 Indiana State Road 252

Cemeteries
The township contains two cemeteries: Otwell and Snow.

References
 United States Census Bureau cartographic boundary files
 U.S. Board on Geographic Names

External links
 Indiana Township Association
 United Township Association of Indiana

Townships in Franklin County, Indiana
Townships in Indiana